Babcock is a lunar impact crater that is located on the far side of the Moon. It was named after American astronomer Harold D. Babcock. It lies on the northeastern edge of Mare Smythii, to the southeast of Mare Marginis. To the south of Babcock is the crater Purkynĕ, and to the east-northeast lies Erro. Babcock is located in a region of the Moon's surface that is occasionally brought into view during favorable librations, although it is seen from the edge and so little detail can be discerned from an observer on the Earth.

The rim of Babcock has been eroded, notched and modified by subsequent impacts, leaving a somewhat irregular and uneven outer rim. The interior has been resurfaced by lava flows, and is relatively flat. In place of a central peak, a small crater lies very close to the crater midpoint. This crater has been designated Zasyadko. A smaller crater lies on the interior near the northern edge.

The area about Babcock has been subject to past inundations by basaltic lava flows, leaving the surface relatively flat and the remnants of ghost craters visible as curved ridges in the ground.

Satellite craters
By convention these features are identified on lunar maps by placing the letter on the side of the crater midpoint that is closest to Babcock.

References

External links

Babcock at The Moon Wiki

Impact craters on the Moon